Tour Alto is an office skyscraper in Courbevoie, in La Défense, the business district of the Paris metropolitan area.

The tower was built in 2020 by Bouygues. Its rounded shape gradually widens upwards and extends its hold in space by an offset of 12 cm towards the outside of the edge beam, on each floor. Thanks to this singular shape, the surface of the levels goes from 700 m2 at the foot of the Tower to 1,500 m2 at the top.

Work began in September 2016 for delivery in 2020.

See also 
 La Défense
 List of tallest buildings and structures in the Paris region
 List of tallest buildings in France

References

External links 
 Tour Alto

Alto
La Défense
Office buildings completed in 2020
21st-century architecture in France